Charles Booker (born October 20, 1984) is an American politician from the commonwealth of Kentucky. He served in the Kentucky House of Representatives, representing the 43rd district from 2019 to 2021. During his term, he was Kentucky's youngest Black state lawmaker.

Booker was a candidate in the Democratic Party's primary for the 2020 U.S. Senate race in Kentucky, drawing national attention before ultimately losing a close race to former Marine fighter pilot Amy McGrath. In April 2021, Booker formed an exploratory committee for the 2022 U.S. Senate race in Kentucky, and formally announced that he was running on July 1, 2021. He won the primary on May 17, but lost to incumbent Republican Rand Paul in the general election. Booker is the first African American to be a major party nominee for U.S. Senate in Kentucky. Following his defeat in the 2022 midterm elections, Booker was appointed by Kentucky Governor Andy Beshear to lead the Governor's Office of Faith-Based Initiatives and Community Involvement.

Early life and education
Booker was born in Louisville, Kentucky, on October 20, 1984, to parents who both dropped out of high school to tend to siblings. Booker graduated from Louisville Male High School. He earned a Bachelor of Science in political science and Juris Doctor from the University of Louisville.

Career 
Booker worked for the Legislative Research Commission until 2014, when he was fired for violating a staff policy against partisan political activity after appearing in a campaign video of Alison Lundergan Grimes, a candidate in the 2014 United States Senate election in Kentucky. He then worked for the Kentucky Department of Fish and Wildlife Resources and West Louisville FoodPort. In 2016, he ran against Gerald Neal in the Democratic Party primary election for the 33rd district of the Kentucky Senate. Booker finished in third place with 20 percent of the vote, behind Neal, who received 48 percent, and Joan Stringer, who received 32 percent.

Following Darryl Owens' retirement from representing the 43rd district in the Kentucky House of Representatives in 2018, Booker ran to succeed him. In a field of seven candidates, Booker won the Democratic nomination with 29.5 percent of the vote, and defeated Republican Everett Corley in the general election by 56 percent.

As part of the Kentucky House of Representatives, Booker served on the economic development and workforce, judiciary, and natural resources and energy committees.

U.S. Senate campaigns

2020 

On January 5, 2020, Booker formally entered the 2020 U.S. Senate race in Kentucky. Booker's platform included universal health care, a Green New Deal to tackle climate change, systemic criminal justice reform and universal basic income. During an interview with CNN on June 6, 2020, Booker stated, "we're building a grassroots campaign that has folks working from every part of a commonwealth," and "we've raised over a million dollars from regular folks because they know how important this moment is." As a progressive Democrat, Booker supported the Bernie Sanders 2020 presidential campaign.

Booker received endorsements from nearly half of the Democrats in the Kentucky House of Representatives, celebrities, unions and organizations. He was endorsed by U.S. senators Elizabeth Warren and Bernie Sanders; U.S. representatives Alexandria Ocasio-Cortez and Ayanna Pressley; Tom Steyer; former U.S. secretary of housing and urban development, Julian Castro; Kentucky state senator Gerald Neal; former Kentucky secretary of state Alison Lundergan Grimes; actress Susan Sarandon; the Working Families Party; and the Sunrise Movement. The editorial boards of the Lexington Herald-Leader and The Courier Journal, Kentucky's two largest newspapers, also endorsed Booker.

The campaign drew national attention in its closing weeks, as Booker swiftly closed a polling gap with McGrath, and because the winner would challenge the Republican leader in the Senate, Mitch McConnell. His surge came after his participation in protests over the death of Breonna Taylor. However, Booker ultimately lost to Amy McGrath, receiving 42.7% of the vote compared to McGrath’s 45.4%. Upon conceding, Booker released a statement, reading in part:

2022 

On July 1, 2021, Booker announced he would run in the Democratic primary for Kentucky's other Senate seat. In his first fundraising quarter (Q3 2021), he raised $1.7 million from 55,000 individual donations. He stated that "98% of our dollars are from grassroots small donors," and asserted his campaign is therefore funded by everyday people.

On May 17, Booker won the Democratic primary, and ultimately lost in a landslide to incumbent Republican senator Rand Paul in the general election. He became the first African American to be a major party nominee for statewide office in Kentucky.

Political positions 

Booker is a progressive who supports reparations for slavery, Medicare for All, criminal justice reform, universal basic income, and a Green New Deal. He supports actively building infrastructure which would rely on clean renewable sources.

Personal life 
Booker and his wife, Tanesha, have three daughters. Booker has type 1 diabetes and has said that he had to ration his insulin when he was younger due to the cost. Booker is a member of Kappa Alpha Psi, an historically black college fraternity.

Electoral history

References

External links

Charles Booker for Senate campaign website

|-

1984 births
20th-century African-American people
21st-century African-American politicians
21st-century American politicians
African-American state legislators in Kentucky
African-American people in Kentucky politics
Candidates in the 2020 United States Senate elections
Candidates in the 2022 United States Senate elections
Living people
Politicians from Louisville, Kentucky
Democratic Party members of the Kentucky House of Representatives
University of Louisville alumni
University of Louisville School of Law alumni
People with type 1 diabetes